Sinospelaeobdella is a genus of jawed land leech, endemic to caves in China. It contains the species S. cavatuses (previously Haemadipsa cavatuses) and S. wulingensis, the latter being named after the Wuling Mountains where it was found.

The diet of this genus is unique among the land leeches, as it exclusively feeds off blood of cave dwelling bats. Its central diet is based on Rhinolophus sinicus, R. pearsonii, R. pusillus, R. macrotis, and Hipposideros armiger.

References 

Clitellata
Leeches